David Argüelles Álvarez (born 10 January 2002) is a Spanish professional footballer who plays as a left back for Sporting B.

Club career
Born in Gijón, Asturias, Argüelles joined Sporting de Gijón's Mareo in 2012, from Colegio de La Asunción. On 6 June 2018, while still a youth, he renewed his contract for a further three years.

Promoted to the reserves in Segunda División B in July 2020, Argüelles made his senior debut on 17 October 2020, starting in a 2–4 home loss against Cultural y Deportiva Leonesa. He scored his first senior goal on 5 September of the following year, netting the opener in a 2–0 Tercera División RFEF away win over CD Covadonga.

Argüelles made his first team debut on 20 March 2022, coming on as a second-half substitute for Pablo García in a 1–1 Segunda División away draw against CD Leganés.

References

External links

2002 births
Living people
Footballers from Gijón
Spanish footballers
Association football defenders
Segunda División players
Segunda División B players
Tercera Federación players
Sporting de Gijón B players
Sporting de Gijón players
Spain youth international footballers